Sword of Rome is a board game for 2-5 players, designed by Wray Ferrell and first published in 2004 by GMT Games. A second edition, which expanded the game to support five players, was published in 2010.

Reception
It was awarded the 2004 Origins Award for Best Historical Board Game.

References

Board games introduced in 2004
Board games about history
GMT Games games
Origins Award winners